Technocracy is a form of government by technicians; specifically: management of society by technical experts.

Technocracy or technocrat may also refer to:
Technocracy movement, a social movement that started in the United States, advocating a post-scarcity society based on energy accounting
Technocracy Study Course, a book written by M. King Hubbert which forms the ideological basis for the Technocracy movement
Technocracy, a band formed by Phil Demmel
Technocracy (EP), a 1987 EP by the band Corrosion of Conformity
Technocracy (Mage: The Ascension), or Technocratic Union, a worldwide conspiracy in the roleplaying game Mage: The Ascension
Technocrat (character), a DC Comics character and former member of the Outsiders